Caravaca de la Cruz, often shortened to Caravaca, is a town and municipality of southeastern Spain in the region of Murcia, near the left bank of the River Argos, a tributary of the Segura. It is the capital of the northwest Region of Murcia. It has a population of 26,449 as of 2010 (INE). In 1900, it had 15,846 inhabitants.

It is the fifth Holy City of Catholic Christianity, having been granted the privilege to celebrate the jubilee year in perpetuity in 1998 by Pope John Paul II, along with Rome, Jerusalem, Santiago de Compostela and Camaleño (Monastery of Santo Toribio de Liébana). It celebrates its jubilee every seven years, the first being in 2003, when it was visited by Cardinal Joseph Ratzinger, later Pope Benedict XVI. In 2010, the second jubilee was celebrated, and it surpassed the one million visits received in 2003. Festivities of International Tourist Interest have occurred since 2004.

Caravaca is dominated by the medieval Santuario de la Vera Cruz (Sanctuary of True Cross), and contains several convents and a fine parish church, with a miraculous cross celebrated for its healing power, in honor of which a yearly festival is held on 3 May. Caravaca is home to many monuments and museums, many of which are important tourist attractions. The hills which extend to the north are rich in marble and iron. The town has been a considerable industrial centre, with large iron-works, tanneries and paper, chocolate and oil factories.

Besides being known by the Christian relic, it also has a festival in its honor between 1 and 5 May of each year, declared of International Tourist Interest in 2004. Along with processions and parades of Moors and Christians, the celebration of Horses of Wine is especially relevant, which now aspires to be the Intangible Cultural Heritage of Humanity by UNESCO.

The Neoclassical painter Rafael Tejeo was born in Caravaca.

A gigantic archeological site was found in January 2009. It is composed of 1300 graves from 2400 to 1950 BC.

Museums 
 Museo de la Vera Cruz. Inside the Castle of Santa Cruz.
 Museo de la Fiesta. Relative to the Festivities in honor of the Santisima y Vera Cruz de Caravaca.
 Museo José Carrilero. Sculpture
 Museo Arqueológico Municipal
 Museo de música étnica de Barranda
 Museo Etnográfico en Miniatura "Angel Reinón"

Monuments 
 Castle and Basilica of Vera Cruz, where they worship the Cross of Caravaca. Located within the Real Alcázar of Islamic origins;
 Iglesia Parroquial de "El Salvador", one of the finest examples of Renaissance architecture in the region of Murcia (16th century);
 Church of the Holy Conception, with a large tower,  within which highlights its coffered ceiling of painted wood (16th century);
 Church of the Jesuits, that is currently used as municipal cultural center (17th century);
 Carmelite Convent and Church Mothers of St. Joseph, of rococo style;
 Discalced Carmelite Convent (founded by St. John of the Cross in 1586);
 Church and Convent of Santa Clara, founded in 1609
 City Hall, Baroque, and whose original layout corresponds to Jaime Bort;
 The "Templete", Baroque-style building and hexagonal inscribed in a circle, which marks the bath Santisima y Vera Cruz de Caravaca each 3 May, ritual act that has been celebrated since 1384;
 The Plaza de Toros, built on a former Franciscan friary, which opened in 1880 and was added with the renovation of 1926, a front neomudejar.
 Several monuments Valencian sculptor Rafael Pi Belda: A San Juan de la Cruz (1983), The Moor and Christian (1986), Via Crucis (2000, Royal Basilica Santuario de la Vera Cruz de Caravaca), a work commemorating the award the Holy See of the Jubilee Year in perpetuity to the Basilica Santuario de la Vera Cruz de Caravaca (2001) and the Horses of Wine (2007). There are more sculptures of other artists as Antonio Campillo Párraga and José Carrilero Gil
The Medieval District (around the castle)
Calle Mayor,Calle de las Monjas, Calle de Rafael Tejeo, Calle Puentecilla, etc. are old streets in Caravaca with examples of houses with the typical coat of arms.

Notable people 
 Mista, retired footballer
 José Manuel Martínez Toral, (born 29 October 1960), is a Spanish retired footballer
 Rafael Tegeo, (November 1798 – October 1856) was a Spanish painter in the Neoclassic style
 Luis Leante,  (born 6 June 1963), commonly known as Luis Leante, is a Spanish novelist and Latin professor.

Festivities 
Festivities in honor of the Santisima y Vera Cruz de Caravaca. Declared of International Tourist Interest in November 2004, held from 1 to 5 May. Include the following acts:

Competition Southeast Migas. "Night of the crumbs. " 30 April.
Bareback horse contest. 1 May.
Processions accompanying the Cruz de Moros y Cristianos (2 and 3 May).
Fiesta de la Santisima y Vera Cruz (3 May).
Moors and Christians parade (4 May).
Procession of the Holy and Vera Cruz. (5 May).

Legend of the Holy Cross and the May Festival 
In the early 8th century, Arabs and Berbers invaded the Iberian peninsula and occupied the territory. Starting a conflict with the local inhabitants that took almost 800 years to resolve, ending with the control of the Iberian peninsula by a coalition of the Christian kingdoms.

In about the middle of that period, in the year 1231 (or 1232 by some accounts), a miracle occurred in the southeastern Spanish town of Caravaca de la Cruz. The town is set among the rugged sierras of Murcia, which at that time was still a Moorish kingdom under Zeyt-Abuzeyt. Being several generations away from the initial invaders, Zeyt-Abuzeyt was from a line of well-established Moorish monarchs and one of his duties was to protect the region from invasion by the Christians. The Christian Reconquesta took various forms; from fighting to gradual infiltration through missionaries.
One such Christian missionary was Don Gínes Pérez Chirinos de Cuenca. He was captured and taken before the Muslim king, who was curious about certain aspects of the Christian faith. In particular, he was interested in the Christian celebration of the Last Supper and asked the missionary to demonstrate the procedure. One can imagine the priest would be reluctant to do this – in those days only believers were present during the sacrament. Nevertheless he agreed, and the king arranged for the necessary apparatus: an altar draped with a pall cloth, bread and wine, and some candles. One important element, however, was missing: the cross.
The missionary explained that the presence of a cross was critical to the Eucharist and he could not continue without one. The king exclaimed: "So what is that?", pointing to something at the window. From the heavens, two angels appeared carrying a cross, which they placed on the altar and then disappeared.

The priest continued with the Mass. According to Catholic belief, when the bread and wine are consecrated during Mass, they cease to be bread and wine, and become instead the body and blood of Christ. The empirical appearances are not changed, but the reality is. When missionary Don reached the consecration stage, the king saw a beautiful baby instead of the bread (Host). The king was so taken aback by this miraculous image that he and his family converted to Christianity and asked to be baptized into the Christian faith. Many believe that the cross delivered by the angels included a piece of the True Cross.

This appearance of the Cross is remembered by the people of Caravaca each year in acts that constitute a real festive tradition supported by a legend with historical foundation recalled from the Middle Ages. Indeed, the May festivities in honor of the Blessed and Vera Cruz are a perfect combination of color, culture, religion and entertainment in which all citizens participate unconditionally, inviting visitors to share the celebrations. More than just a holiday, the fiestas of Moors and Christians of Caravaca are a cult of the past, a tribute to history.

Because of these miracles and the relic of the True Cross, in 1998 Caravaca de la Cruz became the fifth Holy City (along with Santiago de Compostela, Santo Toribio de Liébana, Rome and Jerusalem) celebrating the Perpetual Jubilee in the Vera Cruz Sanctuary (Sanctuario de la Vera Cruz), where the Cross of Caravaca is kept.
Centuries later, after Christopher Columbus set sail on his voyage of discovery (1492) Franciscan friars travelled to the Americas, taking copies of the Caravaca Cross with them. The design is still commonly seen in Central and South American churches and monasteries. Houses and business premises also have copies pinned to the wall like lucky charms, and may be surrounded by a lucky horseshoe.

The Caravaca Cross shows a Corpus on a Patriarchal Cross, often flanked by two angels. The upper of the two bars on the Patriarchal Cross normally represents an inscription; the Caravaca Cross is unusual in that the arms of the corpus are nailed to the upper rather than the lower bar. The power of the Cross of Caravaca is in its original meaning and foremost representation of a religious value that was the maintaining starting point of other values. Without the religious symbolism, the Cross had not had the importance and character development in its history. Secular symbols usually do not cause the same force as religious symbols, which are the meeting place of a transcendent reality and other material.

The Caravaca Cross is the symbol of a city, protecting and giving strength to all its people. It provides a deep feeling of community to all caravaqueños, and it also reaches deep into the heart of the pilgrims who come to visit the Sanctuary. For almost eight centuries of pilgrims' worship it was guarded by the Knights Templar, and later by the Order of Santiago. The Cross also has other connotations and considerations. The historical experiences and experiences of identity accumulated over time have provided it with an emotional function for the local community and for many people elsewhere.

"Los Caballos del Vino" 
Festivity of Caballos del Vino is a celebration "Unique, unusual and passionate" as defined by the writer Ballester on one of his books and is celebrated on 2 May. 
The horses come together to Moors and Christians, the Fiestas de Caravaca de la Cruz are held from 1 to 5 May in honor of the patron saint of the village, the Blessed and Vera Cruz de Caravaca. 
The horses came from Caravaca de la Cruz, on 2 May was done with the streets of the city with its splendid robes embroidered in silk and gold, and the spectacular career of the horses came on the slope of the castle. 
The horses came roaring burst and annually in the spring of Caravaca, on 2 May, opening wide the gates of the festival every year is dedicated to the Blessed. Cruz Caravaca, Murcia Northwest particular corner. A display of fantasy and symbolism. Cult given the strength, value, beauty and the senses. The origins of the festival are lost in the mists of time blending between history and legend.

The town passed to the Knights Templar who, in the 13th century, built the castle that still dominates the town today. At one time, the Knights Templar and townsfolk were under siege by the Muslim army and took refuge in the castle. It wasn't long before the water stored in the castle became unpotable and several of the refugees became ill. Scouts crept out of the castle at night to look for water but found the neighboring wells had been poisoned. In desperation, the scouts raced out of the castle on horses to find a safe source of water. They found some wine, loaded the wineskins on their horses and raced back to the castle.
The wine was blessed in the presence the Caravaca Cross and served to those who had been debilitated by the bad water. They recovered immediately and the blessed wine was mixed with the toxic water in the storage tanks. The water became fresh and as a result, the Christians were able to resist the enemy.

Today, an annual fiesta is held in the town to remember those events, which includes a ceremony to bless the irrigation water used by Caravaca farmers. Before offering and sprucing women to young men and horses richly embroidered robes and bouquets of flowers, considering, in this way, heroes and saviors of the situation. Since the Middle Ages, in more or less splendor, according to the times, the anniversary has been held annually. However, it is in the 18th century, in full Baroque, when the festival begins to appear as such, and during the Romantic Decimónico playful when it reaches the structure it has today. 
The Celebration takes place during the morning of each Dos de Mayo, the eve of the Feast of the Cross, when Caravaca becomes the capital of joy, beauty and festive participation. Wine Horses begin at dawn with the washing and harnessing the horse, in over forty different locations in the city. Few spectators, most linked to the rocks or family have the privilege to attend the ceremony. In the early morning light group (formed by the horse and four horses), is preparing to recognize the streets within hours of the show will be the scenario. Fast runs and solemn presences begin to get followers who have not given up the rock around the passage of celebration.

Entertainment 
Thuiller Theatre, built in 1843 on the old "Court of Comedy". In 2006, after being closed several months, completed the last renovation of the building, reopening to the public in April of that year with the play El hombre de Central Park, by Carlos Larrañaga.

Besides this theater, the Culture House and the cultural center built in the Church of the Society of Jesus are the places where cultural activity centers, film and artistic community.

One of the most established cultural events is the Theatre Week Caravaca de la Cruz, who in 2010 reached its thirtieth edition. It is now done at the end of July each year in the Plaza de Toros in the town.

Since December 2010 is being carried out work on the Multifunctional Center and Auditorium of Caravaca de la Cruz, which has been controversial for its potential visual impact on the Old Town area, although from the drivers of argues that this work will be minimal and that the building itself will be a new attraction for the municipality.

Natural heritage 
'Las Fuentes del Marques' is a place of natural beauty whose role lies in the numerous births of crystalline waters that form a unique setting. This space is located the Tower of the Templars, a small castle in the Middle Ages constituted a defense outpost of Caravaca de la Cruz. It has been installed interpretation center of nature showing the species of birds, fish and small mammals that inhabit the place.

See also
Nasrid raid on Murcia (1392)

References

External links 
Caravaca's town hall

Municipalities in the Region of Murcia
Catholic pilgrimage sites
Holy cities